The 2015 NCAA Division I softball season, play of college softball in the United States organized by the National Collegiate Athletic Association (NCAA) at the Division I level, began in February 2015.  The season progressed through the regular season, many conference tournaments and championship series, and concluded with the 2015 NCAA Division I softball tournament and 2015 Women's College World Series.  The Women's College World Series, consisting of the eight remaining teams in the NCAA Tournament and held annually in Oklahoma City at ASA Hall of Fame Stadium, ended in June 2015.

Florida won their second title in a row, defeating Michigan in the championship series 2 games to one.

Conference standings

Women's College World Series

The 2015 Women's College World Series began on May 28 in Oklahoma City.

Season leaders
Batting
Batting average: .566 – Torrian Wright, Savannah State Lady Tigers
RBIs: 86 – Chelsea Goodacre, Arizona Wildcats
Home runs: 32 – Lexie Elkins, Louisiana Ragin' Cajuns

Pitching
Wins: 36-17 – Erica Romero, San Diego State Aztecs
ERA: 0.87 (26 ER/208.1 IP) – Shelby Turnier, UCF Knights
Strikeouts: 439 – Miranda Kramer, Western Kentucky Lady Toppers

Records
Freshman class consecutive wins streak:
27 – Megan Good, James Madison Dukes; February 14-May 6, 2015

Freshman class perfect games:
4 – Paige Parker, Oklahoma Sooners

Junior class home runs:
32 – Lexie Elkins, Louisiana Ragin' Cajuns

Junior class slugging percentage:
1.229% – Torrian Wright, Savannah State Lady Tigers

Awards
USA Softball Collegiate Player of the Year:
Lauren Haeger, Florida Gators

Honda Sports Award Softball:
Lauren Haeger, Florida Gators

espnW National Player of The Year:
Sierra Romero, Michigan Wolverines

NFCA National Freshman of the Year: 
Paige Parker, Oklahoma Sooners

NFCA Catcher of the Year: 
Lexie Elkins, Louisiana

NFCA Golden Shoe Award: 
Morgan Zerkle, Marshall

All America Teams
The following players were members of the All-American Teams.

First Team

Second Team

Third Team

References